Zbigniew Pacelt (26 August 1951 – 4 October 2021) was a Polish sportsman (swimmer, modern pentathlete), Olympian, coach, sport official, and politician. He competed as a swimmer at the 1968 and 1972 Summer Olympics, and as a modern pentathlete at the 1976 Summer Olympics.

Pacelt was born in Ostrowiec Świętokrzyski. He was elected to the Sejm on 25 September 2005, with 3,982 votes in 33 Kielce district as a candidate from the Civic Platform list.

For his sporting efforts he was awarded the Golden Cross of Merit and Officer's Cross of the Order of Polonia Restituta. He was awarded the title of "Honorary Citizen of Ostrowiec" in 2009.

See also
 Members of Polish Sejm 2005-2007

References

External links
 Zbigniew Pacelt - parliamentary page - includes declarations of interest, voting record, and transcripts of speeches.

1951 births
2021 deaths
Members of the Polish Sejm 2005–2007
Civic Platform politicians
Polish male modern pentathletes
Olympic modern pentathletes of Poland
Modern pentathletes at the 1976 Summer Olympics
Polish male swimmers
Olympic swimmers of Poland
Swimmers at the 1968 Summer Olympics
Swimmers at the 1972 Summer Olympics
Recipients of the Gold Cross of Merit (Poland)
Officers of the Order of Polonia Restituta
People from Ostrowiec Świętokrzyski
Sportspeople from Świętokrzyskie Voivodeship
Polish male freestyle swimmers
Polish male medley swimmers
Members of the Polish Sejm 2007–2011
Members of the Polish Sejm 2011–2015